Sierra de Famatina is mountain range and massif in the Andes of the Argentine province of La Rioja. The range rises between the north-south valleys of Bermejo and Antinaco-Los Colorados. The highest point, designated Cerro General Belgrano (once known as Nevado de Famatina), rises 20,505 ft (6,250 m) and is featured in the coat of arms of La Rioja Province.

See also
Famatina Department, La Rioja
Famatinian orogeny
 Reicheocactus famatimensis 

Landforms of La Rioja Province, Argentina
Mountain ranges of Argentina
Six-thousanders of the Andes
Sierras Pampeanas